Fosterella spectabilis is a bromeliad species in the genus Fosterella. This species is endemic to Bolivia.

References

spectabilis
Flora of Bolivia